Michael Bibby (born May 13, 1978) is an American former professional basketball player. He played professionally for 14 seasons in the National Basketball Association (NBA). He last served as the head coach for Hillcrest Prep Academy in Phoenix, Arizona.

Bibby played college basketball for the Arizona Wildcats, with whom he won the 1997 NCAA Championship. He was drafted second overall by the Vancouver Grizzlies in the 1998 NBA draft. He was named to the NBA All-Rookie First Team in his first season with the Grizzlies. He also played for the Sacramento Kings, Atlanta Hawks, Washington Wizards, Miami Heat and New York Knicks. He is the son of former NBA player Henry Bibby.

Early life
Bibby attended Shadow Mountain High School, and won an Arizona state championship as a point guard under coach Jerry Conner.

College career
As a freshman at Arizona playing under coach Lute Olson, Bibby helped lead the Wildcats to the NCAA championship in 1997, scoring 19 points in the overtime, 84–79 NCAA Championship Game win versus the University of Kentucky and finished third in the voting for the 1998 Wooden Award.  He was selected to the ’97 All-Final Four Team, after also being named Pac-10 Freshman of the Year after posting averages of 13.5 ppg, 5.2 apg and 3.2 rpg. Bibby and his father are one of four father-son duos to each win an NCAA basketball championship.

His sophomore year was just as impressive, as he was named Pac-10 Player of the Year (1997–98), after averaging 17.2 ppg, 5.7 apg and 3.0 rpg (.464 FG%, .387 3FG%, .755 FT%).  He started all 69 games during his Wildcat career and earned First-Team All-America honors after his sophomore campaign.

Following his sophomore season, Bibby entered the 1998 NBA Draft and was selected by the Vancouver Grizzlies with the second overall pick.

NBA career

Vancouver Grizzlies (1998–2001)
In his first season with the Grizzlies, Bibby averaged 13.2 points, 6.5 assists and 2.7 rebounds per game earning NBA All-Rookie honors during the  season which was abbreviated by a labor dispute. He improved those numbers in his next two seasons with the team, averaging 14.5 points per game during the 99-00 season and 15.9 points per game as well as what would be a career-best 8.4 assists per game during the 00-01 season, but the Grizzlies continued to struggle. On January 16, 2000 and April 2, 2000, Bibby twice tied Vancouver's franchise record for steals in a single game with seven. On June 27, 2001, just after the Grizzlies had relocated to Memphis due to a overall lack of success in Vancouver, Bibby and Brent Price were traded to the Sacramento Kings for Jason Williams and Nick Anderson.

Sacramento Kings (2001–2008)

In his first season with Sacramento, Bibby formed one of the league's best duos alongside Chris Webber. The two of them guided the Kings to an NBA best-record at 61–21, and a Pacific division title over their archrivals the Los Angeles Lakers, who at the time were the two-time defending NBA Champions. In the first two rounds of the playoffs, they easily defeated the Utah Jazz and Dallas Mavericks, setting up a Western Conference Finals match-up against the Lakers. The 2002 Western Conference Finals between the Sacramento Kings and Los Angeles Lakers was one of the most memorable in league history. Bibby's performance during the series, perhaps most memorably his Game 5 game winner, earned him a reputation as a clutch performer, and as a reward, he was granted a 7-year, $80.5 million contract.

During the 2002–03 season, Bibby was hampered by injuries, playing in only 55 games, but still averaged a respectable 15.9 points per game with the Kings going 59–23 and securing second seed in the West, as well as a second-consecutive division title. They faced the Utah Jazz and Dallas Mavericks in the first two rounds respectively for the second consecutive playoffs, but after defeating the Jazz, 4–1, lost to the Mavericks in seven games. The Kings had lost Chris Webber to season-ending injury in game 2 against Dallas, but still forced the series to seven games.

For the 2003–04 season, Bibby posted some of the best numbers of his career, scoring 1,506 points (18.4 per game) and helping the Kings reach the playoffs.  Bibby helped to lift the Kings over the Dallas Mavericks in the first round, scoring a career playoff-best 36 points in the clinching Game 5. They would go on to lose in the second round for the second consecutive year, this time to the Minnesota Timberwolves 4–3.

The next two seasons would see Sacramento taking yet another step backwards, losing in the opening round of the playoffs in both years. During the 2005–06 season, Bibby started all 82 games, and averaged a career-high 21.1 points per game. They would lose in the first round of the playoffs to the defending-champion Spurs 4–2.

Bibby was made a guest of honor by the Sacramento Kings as he sat court side to watch the game against the Chicago Bulls on November 20, 2014. Along with former teammate Chris Webber, the pair were introduced to the crowd along with video clips as part of the team honoring its legends.

Atlanta Hawks (2008–2011)
On February 16, 2008 the Atlanta Hawks acquired Bibby in exchange for Shelden Williams, Anthony Johnson, Tyronn Lue, Lorenzen Wright and a 2008 second-round draft pick (which was used to select Sean Singletary.

Battling injuries and joining a Hawks team that was 22–28, Bibby put up 14.1 points and 6.6 assists per game while working in an unfamiliar offense to lead the Hawks to their first playoff berth in eight years. Despite being the eighth seed and expected to be swept out of the first round, Bibby helped the Hawks force an improbable seven-game series against the Boston Celtics, who went on to win the NBA Championship.

The next season, Bibby averaged 15 points, 5 assists and 1.2 steals per game to help the Hawks win their first playoff series since 1999, against the Miami Heat. The Hawks lost in the conference semifinals against the Cleveland Cavaliers. Bibby was also selected as a participant for the Three Point Shooting Competition.

On July 7, 2009, Bibby and the Hawks agreed to a three-year deal worth about $18 million. In the same offseason, the Hawks traded for Jamal Crawford and drafted Jeff Teague. Though Bibby would remain the Hawks starting point guard, he was not relied on to be a top scorer as he had in years past. Bibby was credited for his leadership and unselfishness that helped Atlanta to consecutive playoff appearances.

Washington Wizards (2011)

On February 23, 2011, Atlanta traded Bibby to the Washington Wizards, along with Jordan Crawford, Maurice Evans and a first-round pick in the 2011 draft, in exchange for Kirk Hinrich and Hilton Armstrong. On February 28, 2011, after playing two games for Washington, Bibby agreed to a contract buyout. He gave up his following year's entire $6.2 million salary in hopes of joining a contending team, such as the Los Angeles Lakers, Boston Celtics, San Antonio Spurs or Miami Heat, all of whom expressed interest in Bibby.

Miami Heat (2011) 
On March 2, 2011, the Miami Heat signed Bibby after he cleared waivers. He became the Heat's starting point guard and started all 20 playoff games he appeared in, en route to the first NBA Finals of his career. Playing against the Dallas Mavericks, the Heat were defeated 4 games to 2. Following the season, Miami elected to re-sign the younger Mario Chalmers and draft Norris Cole over re-signing Bibby.

New York Knicks (2011–2012) 
After the NBA lockout, Bibby signed a one-year contract with the New York Knicks, bringing his career full circle to the team that drafted his father, Henry. Backing up Jeremy Lin during the "Linsanity" phenomenon, Bibby saw limited playing time prior to Lin's season-ending injury. He and Baron Davis split starting point guard duties through the rest of the season and in New York's first round playoff series against Miami.

At season's end his contract expired, and he was deemed unlikely to return to the team, after New York signed Raymond Felton and Jason Kidd.

Coaching career
Bibby coached his son Michael Jr. on the Amateur Athletic Union (AAU) club Team Bibby. In 2013, he returned to his alma mater, Shadow Mountain High School, as an assistant basketball coach. He working alongside his former high school coach Jerry Connor, who had also returned that year. Michael Jr. was the starting point guard for the Matadors varsity team, which also included two other teammates from Bibby's AAU team. Conner held the head coach title, but Bibby was the de facto leader of the team. After Shadow Mountain won the state championship that year, Conner left to coach another school, leaving Bibby to run the team as an assistant coach. At the time, Bibby did not hold the certifications for the head coach title.

In February 2019, the Paradise Valley Unified School District confirmed that Bibby was under investigation by Phoenix police for allegedly sexually abusing a teacher at Shadow Mountain High, where Bibby had since become head coach. The teacher alleged that in February 2017 Bibby made sexually explicit statements to her, groped her, and rubbed his genitals against her. As a result of the allegations, he was removed as head coach of the Shadow Mountain High basketball team. In April, the police said that they did not find probable cause for filing charges against Bibby.

Bibby was hired by Hillcrest Prep in Phoenix in October 2019, coaching them for 10 games before both sides mutually parted ways.

Personal life
Bibby is the son of Henry Bibby, a former NBA and UCLA player and former USC basketball coach. Mike's mother, Virginia, is a native of Trinidad and Tobago. Mike Bibby is the nephew of the late former Major League Baseball player Jim Bibby (1944-2010), and the brother-in-law of former Miami Heat teammate Eddie House, who was also his Sacramento Kings teammate during the 2004–05 season.  Mike also has two cousins who became professional athletes, US national team soccer player Robbie Findley and former NFL wide receiver Shaun McDonald. Bibby and his wife, Darcy, have four children. Son Michael Jr. played college ball for South Florida before transferring to Appalachian State in 2017.

Two decades after leaving college for the NBA, Bibby graduated from the University of Nevada, Las Vegas, with a Bachelor of Arts in multidisciplinary studies in 2017.

After graduating from the University of Nevada, Las Vegas, Bibby is now focusing on his bodybuilding and NBA 2k career. He now goes by the nickname, "Yoke God x Clampz".

Career statistics

NBA

Regular season  

|-
| align="left" | 
| align="left" | Vancouver
| 50 || 50 || 35.2 || .430 || .203 || .751 || 2.7 || 6.5 || 1.6 || .1 || 13.2
|-
| align="left" | 
| align="left" | Vancouver
| 82 || 82 || 38.5 || .445 || .363 || .780 || 3.7 || 8.1 || 1.6 || .2 || 14.5
|-
| align="left" | 
| align="left" | Vancouver
| 82 || 82 || 38.9 || .454 || .379 || .761 || 3.7 || 8.4 || 1.3 || .1 || 15.9
|-
| align="left" | 
| align="left" | Sacramento
| 80 || 80 || 33.2 || .453 || .370 || .803 || 2.8 || 5.0 || 1.1 || .2 || 13.7
|-
| align="left" | 
| align="left" | Sacramento
| 55 || 55 || 33.4 || .470 || .409 || .861 || 2.7 || 5.2 || 1.3 || .1 || 15.9
|-
| align="left" | 
| align="left" | Sacramento
| 82 || 82 || 36.3 || .450 || .392 || .815 || 3.4 || 5.4 || 1.4 || .2 || 18.4
|-
| align="left" | 
| align="left" | Sacramento
| 80 || 80 || 38.6 || .443 || .360 || .775 || 4.2 || 6.8 || 1.6 || .4 || 19.6
|-
| align="left" | 
| align="left" | Sacramento
| 82 || 82 || 38.6 || .432 || .386 || .849 || 2.9 || 5.4 || 1.0 || .1 || 21.1
|-
| align="left" | 
| align="left" | Sacramento
| 82 || 82 || 34.0 || .404 || .360 || .830 || 3.2 || 4.7 || 1.1 || .1 || 17.1
|-
| align="left" | 
| align="left" | Sacramento
| 15 || 12 || 31.5 || .406 || .393 || .742 || 3.7 || 5.0 || 1.3 || .1 || 13.5 
|-
| align="left" | 
| align="left" | Atlanta
| 33 || 32 || 33.3 || .414 || .369 || .797 || 3.2 || 6.5 || 1.1 || .1 || 14.1
|-
| align="left" | 
| align="left" | Atlanta
| 79 || 79 || 34.7  || .435 || .390 || .789 || 3.5 || 5.0 || 1.2|| .1 || 14.9
|-
| align="left" | 
| align="left" | Atlanta
| 80 || 80 || 27.4 || .416 || .389 || .861 || 2.3 || 3.9 || .8 || .0 || 9.1
|-
| align="left" | 
| align="left" | Atlanta
| 56 || 56 || 29.9 || .435 || .441 || .630 || 2.6 || 3.6 || .7 || .1 || 9.4
|-
| align="left" | 
| align="left" | Washington
| 2 || 0 || 14.5 || .111 || .000 || .000 || 1.5 || 4.0 || .5 || .0 || 1.0
|-
| align="left" | 
| align="left" | Miami
| 22 || 12 || 26.5 || .437 || .455 || .625 || 2.2 || 2.5 || .5 || .1 || 7.3
|-
| align="left" | 
| align="left" | New York
| 39 || 4 || 14.3 || .282 || .318 || .750 || 1.5 || 2.1 || .5 || .1 || 2.6
|- class="sortbottom"
| style="text-align:center;" colspan="2"| Career
| 1,001 || 950 || 33.9 || .436 || .379 || .802 || 3.1 || 5.5 || 1.2 || .1 || 14.7

Playoffs 

|-
| align="left" | 2002
| align="left" | Sacramento
| 16 || 16 || 41.3 || .444 || .424 || .826 || 3.8 || 5.0 || 1.4 || .2 || 20.3
|-
| align="left" | 2003
| align="left" | Sacramento
| 12 || 12 || 33.7 || .422 || .282 || .794 || 2.6 || 5.0 || 1.2 || .4 || 12.7
|-
| align="left" | 2004
| align="left" | Sacramento
| 12 || 12 || 41.4 || .429 || .436 || .873 || 4.2 || 7.0 || 1.9 || .4 || 20.0
|-
| align="left" | 2005
| align="left" | Sacramento
| 5 || 5 || 40.0 || .391 || .217 || .778 || 4.4 || 6.6 || 1.4 || .4 || 19.6
|-
| align="left" | 2006
| align="left" | Sacramento
| 6 || 6 || 42.5 || .348 || .346 || .900 || 3.8 || 5.2 || 1.5 || .0 || 16.7
|-
| align="left" | 2008
| align="left" | Atlanta
| 7 || 7 || 36.0 || .338 || .292 || .656 || 3.1 || 3.1 || .6 || .3 || 10.3
|-
| align="left" | 2009
| align="left" | Atlanta
| 11 || 11 || 35.5 || .462 || .542 || .955 || 3.4 || 4.2 || .9 || .2 || 13.2
|-
| align="left" | 2010
| align="left" | Atlanta
| 11 || 11 || 26.5 || .450 || .412 || .700 || 2.5 || 2.5 || .8 || .0 || 8.5
|-
| align="left" | 2011
| align="left" | Miami
| 20 || 20 || 20.8 || .281 || .258 || .500 || 1.8 || 1.1 || .6 || .3 || 3.6
|-
| align="left" | 2012
| align="left" | New York
| 5 || 1 || 23.6 || .391 || .412 || .667 || 4.2 || 2.6 || .2 || .0 || 5.4
|- class="sortbottom"
| style="text-align:center;" colspan="2"| Career
| 105 || 101 || 33.2 || .408 || .371 || .815 || 3.1 || 4.0 || 1.1 || .2 || 12.6

College 

|-
| style="text-align:left;"| 1996–97
| style="text-align:left;"| Arizona
| 34 || 34 || 32.6 || .445 || .394 || .701 || 3.2 || 5.2 || 2.2 || .2 || 13.5
|-
| style="text-align:left;"| 1997–98
| style="text-align:left;"| Arizona
| 35 || 35 || 32.0 || .464 || .387 ||.755 || 3.0 || 5.7 || 2.4 || .2 || 17.2
|- class="sortbottom"
| style="text-align:center;" colspan="2"| Career
| 69 || 69 || 32.3 || .456 || .390 || .730 || 3.1 || 5.5 || 2.3 || .2 || 15.4

See also

 List of National Basketball Association career assists leaders
 List of National Basketball Association career 3-point scoring leaders
 List of second-generation National Basketball Association players

Notes

References

External links

1978 births
Living people
African-American basketball players
All-American college men's basketball players
American expatriate basketball people in Canada
American sportspeople of Trinidad and Tobago descent
American men's basketball players
Arizona Wildcats men's basketball players
Atlanta Hawks players
Basketball coaches from Arizona
Basketball coaches from New Jersey
Basketball players from Phoenix, Arizona
Basketball players from New Jersey
Big3 players
High school basketball coaches in Arizona
McDonald's High School All-Americans
Miami Heat players
New York Knicks players
Parade High School All-Americans (boys' basketball)
People from Cherry Hill, New Jersey
Point guards
Sacramento Kings players
Sportspeople from Camden County, New Jersey
Sportspeople from Phoenix, Arizona
United States men's national basketball team players
Vancouver Grizzlies draft picks
Vancouver Grizzlies players
Washington Wizards players
21st-century African-American sportspeople
20th-century African-American sportspeople